Genzlinger is a surname. Notable people with the surname include:

Paul Genzlinger, character on the TV series New Girl
Neil Genzlinger, American critic